Salem Fields Cemetery is a Jewish cemetery located at 775 Jamaica Avenue in the Cypress Hills neighborhood of Brooklyn, New York, United States, within the Cemetery Belt. It was founded in 1852 by Congregation Emanu-El of New York.

Salem Fields is the final resting place for many of the prominent German-Jewish families of New York City. Among those laid to rest in the cemetery are members of the Fox family, founders of 20th Century Fox Film Corp.; the Guggenheim family, who were involved in mining, newspapers, and Guggenheim museums; the Lewisohn family, who were involved in mining, banking, and philanthropy; and the Shubert family, which led a large theatrical empire.

Architectural historian Fredric Bedoire, Professor at the Royal University of Fine Arts in Stockholm, compared the "beautiful" Salem Fields to the architecturally notable mausoleums and undulating landscape of Père Lachaise Cemetery in Paris.   Architect Henry Beaumont Herts designed the Guggenheim family mausoleum, modeled after the Tower of the Winds at Athens. The entrance of Salem Fields was designed by Henry Fernbach, Central Synagogue's architect.

Salem Fields is part of a larger complex of cemeteries spanning into the borough of Queens, including likewise Jewish Machpelah Cemetery, where Harry Houdini is buried; Union Field Cemetery; Mount Judah Cemetery, where several prominent Rabbis lie; Mount Carmel Cemetery; and the non-denominational Cypress Hills Cemetery and Cemetery of the Evergreens.

Notable burials
 Jules Bache (1861–1944), American banker, art collector and philanthropist
 Raphael Benjamin (1846–1906), British-born Australian and American rabbi
 Abram J. Dittenhoefer (1836–1919), lawyer and judge
 Simon M. Ehrlich (1852–1895), lawyer and judge
 William Fox (producer) (1879–1952), founder of the Fox Film Corporation

 Richard James Horatio Gottheil (1862–1936), founder of Zeta Beta Tau
 Joseph B. Greenhut (1843–1918), merchant
 Harry Frank Guggenheim (1890–1971), newspaper magnate
 Meyer Guggenheim (1820–1905), mining industrialist
 Marcus Goldman (1821–1904), investment banker
 Solomon Robert Guggenheim (1861–1949), mining industrialist, philanthropist, art patron
 Louis H. Hahlo (1865–1932), lawyer, member of the New York State Assembly
 Ephraim Arnold Jacob (1845–1905), lawyer and judge
 George E. Jonas (1897–1978), businessman and philanthropist who founded Camp Rising Sun.
 David Leventritt (1845–1926), lawyer and judge
 Leo N. Levi (1856–1904), lawyer and communal worker
 Adolph Lewisohn (1849–1938), mining magnate, banker, art collector, philanthropist; younger brother of Leonard Lewisohn
 Leonard Lewisohn (1847–1902), mining magnate, banker, philanthropist; older brother of Adolph Lewisohn
 Bob Marshall (1901–1939), wilderness activist, forester, author
 Louis B. Marshall (1856–1929), constitutional lawyer, conservationist, Jewish leader, father of Bob Marshall
 Lipman Emanuel Pike (1845–1893), first Jewish player in Major League Baseball
 Adolph Moses Radin (1848–1909), rabbi
 Simon F. Rothschild (1861–1936), businessman
 Adolph L. Sanger (1842–1894), lawyer, President of the New York City Board of Aldermen
 Dorothy Schiff (1903–1989), owner and publisher, New York Post
 Joseph Seligman (1819–1880), banker, businessman
 Isaac Newton Seligman (1855–1917), banker, businessman
 Edgar Selwyn (1875–1944), playwright, theatrical director and producer
 Henry L. Sherman (1870–1938), lawyer and judge
 Jacob J. Shubert (1879–1963), theater owner and operator, director, producer
 Lee Shubert (1871–1953), theater owner and operator, producer
 Samuel S. Shubert  (1878–1905), playwright, theater owner and operator, producer
 Isaac Siegel (1880–1947), U.S. Congressman from New York
 Bernard Silverman (1838–1898), member of the New York State Assembly
 Alfred Steckler (1856–1929), lawyer and judge
 Sol M. Stroock (1873–1941), lawyer
 Julius Tishman (1864–1935), founder of Tishman Realty & Construction
 Felix M. Warburg (1871–1937), financier, philanthropist
 Albert Warner (1884–1967), co-founder of Warner Bros.

See also

 List of cemeteries in the United States

References

External links
 

Jews and Judaism in Brooklyn
1852 establishments in New York (state)
Jewish cemeteries in New York City
Cemeteries in Brooklyn
German-Jewish culture in New York City
Cypress Hills, Brooklyn